Susan Louise Mann (born 1943) is an American historian of China best known for her work on the Qing dynasty and the role of women and gender in Chinese history. She was professor of History at University of California, Davis from 1989 until her retirement in 2010.

Her 1997 book Precious Records: Women in China's Long Eighteenth Century won the Joseph Levenson Book Prize in the field of pre-20th century China and the American Historical Association awarded the Fairbank Prize for the best book in East Asian history to The Talented Women of the Zhang Family (2007). In making their award, the Historical Association said both books were "path-breaking interventions", praising the former for recognizing the important influence of elite Chinese women and the latter for exploring the significance of same-sex social environments for both genders in elite Chinese society, adding that both "brilliantly demonstrated how placing women and gender at the center of the inquiry changes our overall view of Chinese history."

She was president of the Association for Asian Studies (2000) and has been a member of the American Academy of Arts and Sciences since 2013.

Education and career
Mann graduated in Far Eastern languages and literatures from the University of Michigan, then earned her master's degree in Asian languages at Stanford University and then her doctorate there in 1972. Her doctoral dissertation concerned the eighteenth century scholar, Hong Liangji.

She taught briefly at Northwestern University and the University of Chicago in the mid-1970s, and at University of California, Santa Cruz before joining the University of California, Davis, in 1989. At Davis she served as chair of the Department of East Asian Languages and Cultures and the Department of History. She received the Outstanding Mentor Award from the UC Davis Consortium for Women and Research.

She was married to the anthropologist G. William Skinner until his death in 2008.

Scholarship on gender and women
Mann's first works focused on the relation between the Chinese merchant class and local officials, but while at the University of Chicago, The Women's Union asked Mann to be their sponsor. The students discussed feminist theory, which led Mann to ask new questions. She then turned her attention to women and gender relations in Chinese history.

Mann joined feminist scholars in the 1980s and 1990s, including Patricia Ebrey, Charlotte Furth, Dorothy Ko, Evelyn Rawski, Paul Ropp, Ann Waltner, and Ellen Widmer, who turned their attention to the roles of women in the late Ming dynasty and early and mid Manchu Qing dynasty, the 16th through early 19th centuries. This period was relatively unstudied in spite of being the most richly documented period of Chinese history before Western influences became powerful in the 19th century. Economic growth and urbanization brought social mobility, while an expansion of printing and literacy gave voice to women. These recent scholars used texts written  women and  women in addition to texts written by men  or  women. They found that the anti-traditional biases of modern Chinese intellectuals against Confucianism and the traditional family had too often confirmed the same sorts of bias among Western scholars. The new work moved to correct misunderstandings about Confucian traditional society and the assumption that women were passive victims who helped to perpetuate their own victimhood because they were ignorant and powerless.

Precious Records: Women in China's Long Eighteenth Century (1997), won the Joseph Levenson Prize from the Association for Asian Studies, and The Talented Women of the Zhang Family (2007), was a group biography of women in several generations of a literati family in the lower Yangzi region. The first, Precious Records,  showed that upper-class women, although kept in the "inner quarters" and not allowed to participate in political life outside the home, were not mere victims of Confucian patriarchy. Mann used both the writings of the literati in their families, who wrote often appreciative accounts, and their own writings, mainly poetry.

Mann's second prize-winning book, The Talented Women of the Zhang Family, explores many of the same themes but through portraits of three women, a mother, her daughter, and a great-niece, over a period from the 1790s to the 1860s, going from the height of Qing prosperity and peace to the chaos of the Taiping Rebellion.Mann not only translates the poetry of the women, but allows herself to recreate their feelings and invent some scenes that reveal their character.

Gender and Sexuality in Modern China reprinted a range of her essays. Margaret Kuo, writing in China Review International praised her insights on gender and sexuality in modern China and described her as a leading authority on the subject. The essays use approaches from history, literature, philosophy, religion, and other disciplines, but build into an argument that has larger dimensions. Mann shows that the Chinese state played a generous role in regulating gender and sexuality, categories which in turn give historians materials that they can use in innovative ways. Kuo singled out her "masterful treatment" of the rise and fall of dynasties for "illustrating how adopting sexuality as an analytic category enables the historian to tackle areas in which actual women may not have been present but gendered power formations and sexualized ways of understanding the world certainly were." Mann argues that the Chinese state was distinctive for the outsized role it played in regulating gender and sexuality, a role in which "the family, gendered division of labor, and processes of reproduction were more closely tied together with the operation of the state than perhaps in any other political system."

Selected publications

References

Notes

External links 
 Mann, Susan Louise (1943- ) WorldCat Authority Page.
 Susan Mann Google Scholar citations

1943 births
American sinologists
University of Michigan College of Literature, Science, and the Arts alumni
Stanford University alumni
University of California, Davis faculty
Presidents of the Association for Asian Studies
20th-century American historians
21st-century American historians
American women historians
Living people
20th-century American women
21st-century American women